A list of windmills in the Dutch province of Utrecht.

 
Utrecht